is a Japanese comedy manga series by Eiko Kera, and an anime adaptation that was produced from 2002 to 2009. It is an episode-based animated sitcom of the daily experiences of a family of four (the Tachibana family). An anime sequel called  aired from October 6, 2015 to April 5, 2016 in Japan, and is available on Crunchyroll and YouTube.

Overview
On June 5, 1994, serialization began in the Yomiuri Shimbun Sunday edition. It was serialized biweekly from January 6, 2002 to March 19, 2006, and weekly thereafter. Basically, it is a complete episode format consisting of 23 equally sized rectangular frames. It was made into a comic by Media Factory in 1995. A total of 21 volumes have been published. In 2002, it was made into a TV animation and broadcast on TV Asahi. It was made into an animated film in 2003 and a 3D animated film in 2010. The serialization in the Sunday edition of the Yomiuri Shimbun ended on March 11, 2012, but after that, from December 23, 2019, the magazine was changed to "AERA" and serialization resumed, and the book was "Atashinchi SUPER". It will be published from 2021. Cumulative circulation as of January 2016: 12 million copies.

The story is revolves around the "Tachibana Family", which consists of a rough and frugal mother, a taciturn and self-paced father, a plain, octet and slightly clumsy high school student Mikan (I), Yuzuhiko (nickname: Yuzupi, Yu-chan), a junior high school student brother with a shy and unfamiliar with things like love, but naive, theoretical, and steady personality. Many other unique characters are vividly drawn. Immediately after the series started, the story was centered on the family, with Mikan and her mother as the main characters. However, as the serialization continued, episodes interwoven with the relationships of each family began to be drawn.

The stage of the story in the anime work is Tanashi, Nishitokyo, and the family lives in a 3 bedroom five-story apartment building. Starting with Tanashi Station, which is the nearest station, Seibu Shinjuku Line, Seibu Bus, Kanto Bus, Hana Bus, a community bus in Nishi-Tokyo City, etc. are faithfully reproduced in the work (the 1994 time when it was written at the beginning is still Tanashi Station was the old station building).

The original book has been translated and published in Chinese and Korean, and the TV animation is also broadcast in South Korea, Taiwan, Hong Kong, Indonesia, Malaysia, and India.

Characters

The Tachibana family

voiced by: Kenichi Ogata; Fujiko Takimoto (child, 1st season)
A salaryman who works in Downtown Tokyo. He is the characteristic middle-aged Japanese working man who is a heavy beer drinker, smokes often, and frequents the pachinko parlors. However, he finds the time to be there for his family, and is often helpful on his Sundays off. He drives a blue hatchback coupe, but commutes to work by commuter train.

voiced by: Kumiko Watanabe
A modern-day Japanese housewife, who arrogantly prides herself on a clean home, a balanced budget, and a frugal yet "tasty" dinner. Although at times she finds nifty tricks to multitask and consolidate household chores (like vacuuming the rug and waxing the wooden floor all at once), she is awfully clumsy and gets herself into sticky situations from losing control. Despite her hard work, she is also known for being somewhat lazy by taking copious afternoon naps, watching TV while eating senbei and skimping out on shopping and cooking on rainy days.

voiced by: Fumiko Orikasa
A 17-year-old second-year high school student, and is the intended "main protagonist" of the series. (The "atashi" (me) in the title.) She goes to a public high school, which is a long, stressful commute away. It also doesn't require school uniforms. She is portrayed as an easy-going, relaxed girl who likes to have fun. Often very maiden-like, but other times very tomboyish, she goes through every day with something funny happening.

voiced by: Daisuke Sakaguchi; Yuka Inokuchi (infants); Mariya Ise (child, 2nd season) 
A second-year junior high school student who is very studious and forward-thinking. He is innovative and his brain far exceeds his age. He tends to find solutions to the family's common mishaps.

Supporting characters

People related to Mikan

Mikan's closest relatives 

voiced by: Kaori Matoi (1st season); Yūko Iida (2nd season)
Mikan's classmate. She is Mikan's high school friend that attended different junior high school, but she is a close friend with Mikan. She is mature and has a good style, and I respect tangerines anyway.On the other hand, Shimi-chan likes the innocent  side of Mikan.The only thing she know is that Mikan like Iwaki, but she thought Mikan were Yoshioka's favorite until she was able to tell them about it.

voiced by: Yūsuke Numata
Mikan's classmate from the same junior high school (Minami Junior High School). He has a slightly awkward and romantic personality. Mikan and he have been friends since junior high school, but we have no feelings of love. Iwaki and he get along well and sometimes make fun of Mikan and say unnecessary things.

voiced by: Haruna Ikezawa
Mikan's classmate whose real name is Yuka (from anime 1st season). She is usually quiet, but when she smiles and she hugs her belly without worrying about others. She has white skin and is envied by Mikan.

voiced by: Hikaru Midorikawa; Makoto Tsumura (child)
Mikan's classmate. He is tall and has a warm personality. He is on good terms with Yoshioka. He once picked up a ballpoint pen that Mikan dropped on the bus. Since then, Mikan has fallen in love with him so much that she can't even stand in front of him, but Iwaki himself doesn't realize it.

voiced by: Rie Tanaka
Mikan's classmate. She has a cool personality. Together with Shimi-chan, she sometimes makes fun of Mikan, who can't read the mood. She is tall and gentle, a young lady-type beautiful girl. She is very popular with boys, but she is a so-called natural blur and often loses the goodwill of others.

Bear Brigade Club 

voiced by: Makiko Ohmoto
A member of Teddy Bear Brigade Club. She is a rich daughter who lives in a mansion, but she does not put it on her nose, and she is rather disgusting in the upper class life, and she wants to live in a downtown area. She has teddy bears in her room, just like Mikan. She has a stylish mother wearing makeup in the house, and her uncle who manages a dandy father and villa.

voiced by: Harumi Asai
A member of Teddy Bear Brigade Club. She is chubby and small eyes. She is gluttonous and greasy, and brought a voluminous hamburger and fried chicken during the break of the school festival. 

voiced by:Yuki Kajita
A member of Teddy Bear Brigade Club, she is on good terms with Asada, and they often act in pairs, such as chatting with each other. She always performing a duet with Mikan and shows off her harmonious singing voice. She basically agrees with everyone's opinion and goes out of control.

voiced by: Chiaki Morita
A junior (first year high school student) who joined the club when Mikan and the others were in their second year of high school. She speaks with "ssu" at the end of her words. She looks chubby and has a shaved head with round glasses. At the teddy bear exhibition, he performed a breakdance while wearing a bear costume to attract customers, and the exhibition ended on a high note. She is the only one in Teddy Bear Brigade Club who has a boyfriend.

voiced by: Hiroshi Kamiya
A man in a relationship with Nitta, a very normal gentle-looking guy with glasses. He described the members of Bear Lab as "there are people who seem to have a strong prejudice, and described Mikan as the most beautiful woman in Bear Lab.

 Mikan's classmates 

voiced by: Masayo Kurata
A girl with a laid-back, easy-going, and kind personality. She is Mikan's classmate. She is not named after her in the original work. He is good at praising her classmates, finding good points and honestly praising them.

voiced by: Yuri Shiratori
She longs for a sailor suit, and she has been to school in a sailor suit under the influence of Miyajima-sensei's story of "What you can only do now."

voiced by: Takahiro Yoshimizu
He has a rectangular face. Only appears on the anime.

voiced by: Mari Maruta
She belongs to the tennis club. Only appears on the anime. 

voiced by: Nobuyuki Hiyama
His house is so close to the school that it takes less than two minutes. Only appears on the anime.

voiced by: Junko Minagawa
She has a mature appearance and is rather beautiful. She likes Shimi-chan, but she doesn't like Mikan's childish behavior and remarks when she's with her.

voiced by: Chieko Atarashi
Mikan's friend since elementary school. 

According to Mikan, he is a "normal" boy, but her mother, who saw his photo, criticized him as "a face that will definitely cause problems for women in the future."

voiced by: Kōsuke Okano
He has an indecisive personality. Mikan's mother praised him as "handsome enough to be an actor," but Mikan denies it. Only appears on anime.

voiced by: Takeharu Ōnishi
Mikan's mother praised him for being handsome, but he has a long face that earned him the nickname "Moai." Only appears on anime.

voiced by: Masashi Kitamura
He had a crush on Emiko, but it's one-sided love. Only appears on anime.

voiced by: Akemi Kanda
Anime-only character. Her mother, whose hobby is baking bread, also appeared.

 Mikan's teachers 

voiced by: Ken Shiroyama; Kōichi Tōchika (young)
Mikan's classic literature teacher. A teacher with white hair and glasses.During class, he often talks about his own experiences and thoughts (however, the students don't like that), and Mikan is often interested in the story.

voiced by: Shinichiro Ohta
Mikan's homeroom teacher. In charge of world history. His students affectionately call him "Murakami-chan" behind his back.

voiced by: Yūko Nagashima→Kaoru Shimamura→Masako Katsuki
Mikan's physical education teacher.

voiced by: Akiko Takeguchi
The homeroom teacher of the class next to Mikan. In charge of mathematics in Mikan's class. 

voiced by: Takashi Nagasako
Mikan's art teacher. His nickname is "Satosen". His real name "Satō" was revealed in the second season.

voiced by: Kazuo Oka

voiced by: Hidenari Ugaki

voiced by: Hidenari Ugaki

voiced by: Nobuaki Sekine

voiced by: Yumi Tōma

voiced by: Show Hayami

voiced by: Takahiro Yoshimizu

 Mikan's high school acquaintances 

voiced by: Junko Shimakata

voiced by: Yuki Matsuoka

voiced by: Akemi Kanda

voiced by: Ayako Kawasumi

voiced by: Hiroki Shimowada

 Mikan's elementary school friends 

voiced by: Taeko Kawata

voiced by: Fujiko Takimoto

voiced by: Miwa Matsumoto→Yukiko Amada

voiced by :Mai Kadowaki

voiced by: Hiroko Taguchi

voiced by: Akiko Suzuki

voiced by: Tomoko Kaneda

 Mikan's middle school friends 

voiced by: Hiroki Shimowada

voiced by: Kōki Miyata

voiced by: Yuki Matsuoka

 Mikan's friends' parents 

voiced by: Akemi Okamura

voiced by: Ryoka Yuzuki

voiced by: Kōji Totani

voiced by: Shinpachi Tsuji

voiced by: Gara Takashima

 Mikan's other acquaintances 

voiced by: Megumi Nasu

voiced by: Tōru Ōkawa

voiced by: Minoru Inaba (Bakery Manager), Hiromi Nishikawa (Bakery Manager's Wife)

voiced by: Takahiro Yoshimizu→Jun Hattori→Daiki Nakamura

voiced by: Haruka Kamiya

voiced by: Shino Kakinuma→Sayuri Yoshida

 People related to Mother 

 Mother's closest relatives 

voiced by: Rikako Aikawa
Mother's friend. She is Jun's mother, one of Mikan's elementary school classmate . She is 45 years old. She is active and has many hobbies. She is the type to "think up and act immediately". She often enjoys shopping with other members, and invites her to Ginza, mountain climbing, and pottery. She is especially close to her mother, who goes to swimming school together. She is good at making things by hand, she makes kamaboko and datemaki.

voiced by: Sakiko Tamagawa
Mother's friend. A relatively elegant impression among the three. She wears square glasses with rounded edges, which she rarely removes, with the exception of episode 18 of season 2 of the anime. Her undressed figure looks just like her daughter. Her favorite phrase is "". Although she doesn't seem to match with Mother and Mizushima, she actually gets along with her because she's a big-hearted and friendly person (her way of thinking is similar).

voiced by: Nana Yamaguchi
Mother's friend. She has the most common sense among the four, and is often taken aback by her mother's irrelevant remarks. On the other hand, when she travels to Kyoto, she dresses up as a maiko (apprentice geisha), tries to eat while standing near the station, and is influenced by her mothers to reach the same level. She appears the least of the four.

voiced by: Naoko Watanabe
Miss Mizushima's friends. She is 40 years old. "Hohoemi-san" is a nickname given by Mother who can't remember her name (she once called her "Hohoemi-san"). Mizushima doesn't call her "Hohoemi-san" in the original, but she usually calls her "Machiko-san" in the anime, but there was a time when she called her "Hohoemi-san" only once in the first season of the anime.

 Mother's relatives 

voiced by: Mizuka Arima; Minako Tsutsu (young Grandma)
Mother's mother. She is Mikan and Yuzuhiko's maternal grandmother. She speaks fluent Kyushu dialect. Her face shape is just like mother, and she has a stubborn and stingy personality just like mother. Like mother, her cooking was bad, but her mother's taste was Chikuzenni (her ingredients and seasoning changed depending on her mood).

voiced by: Hiroshi Ito
Mother's father. She is Mikan and Yuzuhiko's maternal grandfather. He seems to have adapted to the times, and refused mother's gift of a hot spring trip on the grounds that "the toilet must have a washlet." Father even laughed at him, saying, "Times have changed."

voiced by: Masako Miura (Cousin A); Makoto Tsumura (Cousin B); Misato Fukuen (Cousin C/Hiro-kun)
Mother's nephew. During their childhood, their played with Mikan and Yuzuhiko at Mother's parents' house. One of them, nicknamed "Hiro-kun," took a nap right after drinking the juice, causing a rare incident in which a large swarm of ants gathered in his mouth.

 Mother's neighbors 

voiced by: Kimiko Saitō
A housewife who lives next door to the Tachibana family. She works as a mangaka and she has two assistants.

voiced by: Miki Itō
A young housewife who lives on the same floor of the same apartment as the Tachibana family. Her son is Tatkun, who feels strangely attached to Yuzuhiko. 

A neighbor of the Tachibana family who lived in front of Koshino, who appears only in the original work. She gave some dried fish to mother. The story of dried fish is replaced by Koshino instead of Suzuki in the anime.

 Mother's acquaintances 

voiced by: Yoshino Takamori
A friend of mother's calligraphy club. She has an elegant personality and doesn't get along well with mother.

voiced by: Rei Sakuma

voiced by: Mami

voiced by: Hiroko Emori

voiced by: Sayuri Sadaoka

voiced by: Miya Hanaki

voiced by: Kei Hayami

voiced by: Iruka Nanami

voiced by: Michie Tomizawa

 Mother's high school friends 

voiced by: Toshihiko Nakajima

voiced by: Shingo Hiromori; Kenji Nojima (young)

voiced by: Tomie Takaoka

voiced by: Kissei Kumamoto

 Mother's favorite store clerks 

voiced by: Tomoko Kawakami

voiced by: Misa Watanabe

voiced by: Takashi Nagasako (TV series); Masafumi Kimura (2nd movie)

voiced: Tomomichi Nishimura

 Mother's other acquaintances 

voiced: Fujiko Takimoto

voiced: Jouji Nakata

voiced: Michihiro Ikemizu

voiced by: Masako Katsuki

 People related to Yuzuhiko 

 Yuzuhiko's closest relatives 

voiced by: Kappei Yamaguchi
Yuzuhiko's classmate and best friend. Initially envious of Yuzuhiko, who has her older sister, he is deeply in love with Mikan (even though he has only seen her face for a moment), but later portrays him as having a crush on Sudo. He talks a lot, and his thoughts come out easily.

voiced by: Kōki Miyata→Mitsuki Saiga→Mizuki Otsuka
Yuzuhiko's classmate. He often joins Yuzuhiko and Fujino. A fan of Marumi Maruno, just like Yuzuhiko. He is insensitive. He is good at mimicry. Yuzuhiko thinks Nasuo is troublesome because he interprets other people's stories in his own way and spreads them as rumors. He also knows the fact that Fujino has a crush on Sudo.

voiced by: Etsuko Kozakura
Yuzuhiko's classmate. She is a little conscious of Yuzuhiko. Her words and actions are absurd and difficult for those around her to understand, but Yuzuhiko can generally understand them accurately. She also often ends his words with "~nanoda", and sometimes sings "Papopoppapo" (from the anime).

voiced by: Kyōko Hikami
Yuzuhiko's classmate. She has a witty personality and is a good understanding of Ishida. She is also good friends with Yuzuhiko and Fujino. Her dislikes are cabbage rolls and Fukujinzuke. Yuzuhiko called her "Sudo-san (rarely Sudo-chan)", Fujino called her "Sudo-chan", and Ishida called her "Sudo".

voiced by: Wasabi Mizuta
Yuzuhiko's classmate. She is jealous and often gets angry with Ishida and Sudo, who are on good terms with Yuzuhiko. She forms Yuzuhiko's fan club with Yamashita.

voiced by: Yōko Teppōzuka
Yuzuhiko's classmate. Kawashima's best friend. Like Kawashima, she likes Yuzuhiko and is overjoyed just by talking to him, but compared to the runaway Kawashima, her affection falls within the category of common sense.

voiced by: Noriko Uemura
A middle-aged female teacher who is Yuzuhiko's homeroom teacher. She has a persistent and sticky personality with a glaring look and a dull voice, and she never forgives any leftovers from students' school lunch.

 Yuzuhiko's classmates 

voiced by: Mitsuki Saiga→Yasuhiro Takato→Kenji Nojima
Yuzuhiko's friend from different class. He joins baseball club and recruited Yuzuhiko and Fujino to the understaffed baseball club (from the second season of the anime). In the early days of the first season of the anime, he was only credited as "Boy A".

voiced by: Eri Miyajima
A female honor student who often says "I can't do anything", "I've already thrown it away", and "Seriously 0 points" while getting the highest score in the grade. She is good at history.

voiced by: Miwa Kōzuki
She is the most beautiful girl in her class and is very popular with boys.

voiced by: Fujiko Takimoto→Mayumi Yamaguchi→Youko Wakana
She was in love with Yuzuhiko, and took advantage of the gift he gave to Fujino, who was craving chocolate for Valentine's Day, and gave it to her favorite, Yuzuhiko.

 Yuzuhiko's teachers 

voiced by: Kazu Koseki
Mathematics teacher. He always makes students who late to answer math problems.

voiced by: Yasunori Matsumoto→Hisao Egawa→Tetsu Inada
Physical education teacher. A typical P.E. teacher who likes P.E. Even in the middle of winter, he wears short-sleeved shirts to class, so he's called a "crazy guy."

voiced by: Minoru Inaba
Known as "Katosen". He is characterized by a languid way of speaking with a local accent, and is often imitated by his students.

voiced by: Ryōtarō Okiayu

voiced by: Ryūji Nakagi

voiced by: Kazuhiro Nakata; Katsumi Suzuki (season 1)

voiced by: Satsuki Yukino

 Yuzuhiko's baseball upperclassmen 

voiced by: Yūichi Iguchi

voiced by: Hitoshi Yanai

voiced by: Ikkyu Juku

 Yuzuhiko's other acquaintances 

voiced by: Yōsuke Akimoto

voiced by: Sumomo Momomori

voiced by: Kozue Kamata

voiced by: Omi Minami

voiced by: Yuzuru Fujimoto

 Yuzuhiko's idols 

voiced by: Youko Wakana

voiced by: Naoko Takano

 People related to Father 

 Father's closest relatives 

voiced by: Mantarō Iwao
Father's friend. A man from the same hometown as Father, he is a dandy, slender gentleman compared to Father. He gets along well with father, and goes to an izakaya run by a young couple with him, exchanging glasses and complaining about various things. His hobby is senryu, and he once brought in a haiku book he wrote himself and showed it to Father.

voiced by: Takashi Taguchi (Master); Ren Kato (young); Orie Kimoto (Mako)
A couple who runs a pub where Father and Hiroshi frequent visted. The husband's name has not been revealed, but he is 46 years old.
In the anime she was given the last name "Inoue". In the first period, she only appeared in her husband (however, she did not speak at that time), but in the second season, Mako also appeared, and the master also began to speak.

She is Mikan Yuzuhiko's paternal grandmother, and she died when Mikan was 3 years old (Yuzuhiko was born a month after her grandmother's death). She was suddenly hospitalized and Father returned to Kyushu, but as a result of her surgery, it turned out that she was already too late. When Father returned to his parents' home in Ōita, he cried alone in front of her portrait (Mother said it was the only tears she had ever seen of him).

voiced by: Chizuko Hoshino
Mikan and Yuzuhiko's aunt.
 Father's other acquaintances 

voiced by: Ken Narita
Father's collague from same company.

voiced by: Hiroshi Naka
Father acquaintance from Oita. He works for a large company called Tokairin Shoji. He is nicknamed "Satsumaage-san" by Mother and Mikan because his head resembles a satsumaage. He had come to drink with Father, but he forgot his company documents and left.

voiced by: Kaoru Morota
The actress whose father into. When father watches programs featuring Mrs. Baisho, he only watches scenes where she is shown. Mother says she is the same type as herself, saying she is a big-mouthed, strong-willed woman.

voiced by: Katsuhisa Hōki
Father's uncle that has a strict personality.

voiced by: Kenji Nojima, Yukiko Amada (child)
Katsuyoshi's son. He was naughty in his childhood.

An acquaintance of father. Anime original character. His names only appeared in the second season.

Media
Manga
Written and illustrated by Eiko Kera, the Atashinchi manga began serialization in the Yomiuri Shimbun in June 1994 and ran until November 2014. The first tankōbon volume was released by Media Factory on April 26, 1995. The manga returned with a new serialization in December 2019.

Anime
Atashin'chi
An anime adaptation produced by Shin-Ei Animation aired on All-Nippon News Network from April 19, 2002 to September 19, 2009 for 330 episodes. Akitaro Daichi and Tetsuo Yasumi served as directors, while Motoi Sakuraba composed the music.

The official Atashin'chi YouTube channel began streaming the first two episodes with English subtitles on May 15, 2020. Shin-Ei Animation and AlphaBoat are planning on streaming about 270 episodes in their original order until March 2021. The final episode of the series aired on YouTube on August 3, 2022.

Shin Atashin'chiShin Atashin'chi, a sequel to the original 2002 anime series, aired on Animax from October 6, 2015 to April 5, 2016 for 26 episodes. Shin-Ei Animation returned for the series' production. Ogura Hirofumi served as director, Akifumi Tada composed the music, while the original creator Eiko Kera wrote stories specifically for the series.

Crunchyroll began simulcasting the series outside of Asia on October 6, 2015.

 Movie 

 Atashin'chi Movie 
On December 6, 2003, to commemorate the 45th anniversary  of TV Asahi, the animated movie "" which depicts the change of Mother and Mikan, was released. This film distributed by Toei Distribution. The length of this film is 95 minutes.The director is Tetsuo Yasumi.The script is written by Kazuyuki Ryosawa and Natsuko Takahashi.  Akiko Yano participated in this movie by sing the theme song. It is also a collaboration between Toei, TV Asahi, and Shin-Ei Animation and commemorates the 45th anniversary of TV Asahi first broadcasting. The initial title was "Atashin'chi New Year's Movie"

The catch copy was "Congratulations 'Mother' silver screen debut ♪ Something will happen to the Tachibana family this winter!" in the early stages and replaced by "Oh my, Mother and Mikan have been replaced! What? What do you want to do?"

Even before the start of Atashin'chi broadcast on TV Asahi, TV Asahi and Toei planned to release this film. Before its release, TV Asahi and Toei said, "We want to make a series that lasts for 10 years and 20 years as a national animation as a work that the whole family can enjoy," and set the target box office revenue of 3 billion yen under "Doraemon movie" Despite an unusual campaign in which 10 of the main character's visited places where there were requests for business trips such as personal events all over the country, the box office revenue was 900 million yen, falling short of the target, and it was not made into a series. 

It was screened in Taiwan from February 9, 2007, and in Hong Kong from January 17, 2008, recording the highest ticket sales in the second week of its release.

 Atashin'chi 3D Movie 
In the second movie, a 3D movie " " was released on November 13, 2010. This film distributed by Toei Distribution. The length of this film is 43 minutes. Shin-ei Animation's first 3D movie. The director is Wataru Takahashi, who is making his feature film directorial debut. Screenplay by Hiroshi Ohnogi. Yoko Yazawa is in charge of the theme song. In addition, Tetsuo Yasumi, who was in charge of directing the previous work and the TV series, will be in charge of supervision.

The slogan is "I will announce it! My mother can now use her supernatural powers!!" 

Although it was released on a small scale of 89 screens nationwide, it is popular among elementary school students and their parents, accounting for 80% of the total. Ranked 9th for the first time in the ranking (according to Kogyo Tsushin).

It was also screened overseas, in Taiwan from January 21, 2011, and in Hong Kong from February 10, 2011.

Opening and ending themes

Openings
「さらば」/"Saraba" by Kinmokusei (Episodes 1–142)
「あたしンちの唄」/"Atashin'chi no Uta" by Kyōko Koizumi (Episodes 143–297)
「プロリンサイズ♪」/"Purorin Size" by Morisanchuu (Episodes 298–330)
「Let's Go! あたしンち」/"Let's Go! Atashin'chi" by The Tachibanas (Kumiko Watanabe, Fumiko Orikasa, Daisuke Sakaguchi, Kenichi Ogata)  (Shin Atashin'chi)

Endings
「来て来てあたしンち」/"Kite Kite Atashin'chi" by Aya Hirayama, adapted from Sir Edward Elgar's Pomp and Circumstance Marches'' (Episodes 1–161, 328)
「Let's Go! あたしンち」/"Let's Go! Atashin'chi" by The Tachibanas (Kumiko Watanabe, Fumiko Orikasa, Daisuke Sakaguchi, Kenichi Ogata) (Episodes 162–232, 329)
「ほっとっとっとな まいにち」/"Hottottotto na Mainichi" by Kigurumichiko (Episodes 233–304)
「プロリンサイズ♪」/"Purorin Size" by Morisanchuu (Episodes 305-327)
「さらば」/"Saraba" by Kinmokusei (Episode 330)
[ろっか・ばい・まい・べいびい] /"rokkabaimaibeibii" by Haruomi Hosono (Shin Atashin'chi)

Movie 
「あたしンち」/"Atashin'chi" by Akiko Yano (Atashin'chi Movie)
"SUGAR!SUGAR!!SUGAR!!!" by Yoko Yazawa (Atashin'chi 3D Movie)

Inserts
 by Mikan (Fumiko Orikasa)
 by Mother (Kumiko Watanabe)

References

External links
  Official homepage (TV Asahi)
  Official homepage (Shin'ei Animation)

1994 manga
2002 anime television series debuts
2015 anime television series debuts
2003 anime films
2009 Japanese television series endings
Animated television series about families
Japanese children's animated comedy television series
Japanese animated films
Anime series based on manga
Comedy anime and manga
Manga adapted into films
Manga adapted into television series
Media Factory manga
Kadokawa Dwango franchises
Seinen manga
Shin-Ei Animation
TV Asahi original programming
Animax original programming
Works originally published in Japanese newspapers
Animated sitcoms